The Roman Catholic Diocese of Temuco is the ecclesiastical circumscription of the Catholic Church that, with its seat in Temuco, shares the ecclesiastical government of the territory of  Araucanía Region (Chile) together with the Diocese of Villarrica, covering the entire Province of Malleco and part of the Province of Cautín. In its totality it includes the communes of Perquenco, Galvarino, Cholchol and Temuco, and most of the communes of Lautaro, Nueva Imperial and Carahue. It is a suffragan of the Roman Catholic Archdiocese of Concepción. The Diocese of Temuco is the current administrator of the Temuco Catholic University.

History
 1908: Established as Mission “sui iuris” of Temuco from the Diocese of Concepción
 18 October 1925: Promoted as Diocese of Temuco

Bishops
 Bishops of Temuco (Roman rite), in reverse chronological order
 Bishop Hector Eduardo Vargas Bastidas (2013.05.14 – 2022.03.07) 
 Bishop Manuel Camilo Vial Risopatrón (2001.09.21 – 2013.05.14)
 Bishop Sergio Otoniel Contreras Navia (1977.12.23 – 2001.09.21)
 Bishop Bernardino Piñera Carvallo (1960.12.10 – 1977.12.28), resigned; appointed Archbishop of La Serena in 1983
 Bishop Alejandro Menchaca Lira (1941.08.09 – 1960.09.13)
 Bishop Augusto Osvaldo Salinas Fuenzalida, SS.CC. (1939.08.29 – 1941.02.09), appointed Auxiliary Bishop of Santiago de Chile
 Bishop Alfredo Silva Santiago (1935.02.23 – 1939.02.04), appointed Bishop of Concepción; future Archbishop
 Bishop Prudencio Contardo Ibarra, C.SS.R. (1925.12.14 – 1934.12.15); was Vicar General and titular bishop here, 1920-1925
 Bishop Ricardo Sepúlveda Hermosilla (Apostolic Administrator 1908 – 1919)

Auxiliary bishop
Jorge Maria Hourton Poisson (1992-2001)

Other priest of this diocese who became bishop
Ricardo Sepúlveda Hermosilla (priest of diocese of Concepción who was then Vicar General here, 1908-1919; titular bishop in 1911)

Sources
 Giga-Catholic Information
 Catholic Hierarchy
 Diocese website

Roman Catholic dioceses in Chile
Christian organizations established in 1908
Roman Catholic dioceses and prelatures established in the 20th century
Temuco, Roman Catholic Diocese of
1908 establishments in Chile